Oswald Georg Hirmer (February 28, 1930 Amberg, Germany– March 5, 2011) was a Roman Catholic bishop of the Roman Catholic Diocese of Umtata, South Africa.

Born in Germany, Hirmer was ordained a priest in 1955.  In 1997, he was named bishop of the Umtata Diocese.  Hirmer retired in 2008 and henceforth was bishop emeritus. Bishop Hirmer died on March 5, 2011.

Notes

20th-century Roman Catholic bishops in South Africa
1930 births
2011 deaths
21st-century Roman Catholic bishops in South Africa
German emigrants to South Africa
Roman Catholic bishops of Umtata
20th-century German Roman Catholic priests